is a Japanese fantasy light novel series written by Kakeru Kobashiri and illustrated by Takashi Iwasaki, with partial character designs by Yoshinori Shizuma, and a spinoff sequel of Kobashiri's earlier series Grimoire of Zero. Kodansha have published six volumes since August 2018 under their Kodansha Ranobe Bunko imprint. A manga adaptation with art by Tatsuwo has been serialized in Kodansha's shōnen manga magazine Monthly Shōnen Sirius since July 2019. It has been collected in six tankōbon volumes. The manga is licensed in North America by Kodansha USA. An anime television series adaptation by Tezuka Productions aired from April to July 2022.

Premise
Saybil, a young magic school student, has lost his memory. With nothing to guide him to clues regarding his past life, he meets a silver-haired woman, along with the promise of "special training". However, all is not as it seems. And what are the intentions of the mysterious witch, with eyes like his own, who had recruited him?

Characters

Main

The main protagonist of the story, Saybil is a struggling student at the Royal Academy of Magic in the realm of Wenias, with no memories of his boyhood past other than a silver-haired witch with eyes the same as his. He claims that he can wield powerful magic but chooses not to use it, as he is afraid of his infinite magical powers going out of control, all of which is inherited from his long-lost father the infamous high sorcerer Thirteen who had "stolen" the Grimoire of Zero and was supposedly executed for insinuating war between witches and humans more than a decade ago. He earns his title as "Abyss Sorcerer" from his aunt Zero as a reference to his boundless magic being like a bottomless pit, which is one of the meanings of "abyss". He ends up leaving with Kudo and Holt upon finally graduating and has accepted a job on gathering more information on Remnants of Disaster at the Forbidden Library.

A three hundred-year-old witch girl with a semi-sentient mystical staff of Luden that can take on different forms and supposedly eats other witches who touch it by absorbing all of their uniquely powerful magic into itself, thus killing them in the process. Professor Loux agrees to escort Saybil on his mission, in hopes of getting to read the renowned yet dangerous Grimoire of Zero, or meet Zero herself. How she was given longevity and perpetual youth remains a mystery. She was great friends with Sorena the most high Mooncaller Witch until her wrongful demise by pyre. After exposing Bishop Edmeanor's plot in inciting further war against witches, sorcerers and humans by using his own miniature Remnant of Disaster against him, she goes to be rewarded by finally reading the legendary Grimoire of Zero at the Forbidden Library. 

A sixteen-year-old fourth-year student at the Academy, making her somewhat more experienced in magic than Saybil. In contrast to him, Holt is a top student in her class. She was born a beastfallen deer, but is capable of maintaining her humanoid looks, much unlike Mercenary, Holdem or Kudo. According to Zero's extensive expertise, she will be strong enough to lay waste to dozens of armies in mere seconds with her magic alone in the next decade. She ends up leaving with Kudo and Saybil upon finally graduating and has accepted a job on gathering more information on Remnants of Disaster at the Forbidden Library.

A lizard beastfallen student at the Academy with a brusque demeanor, but deep down, cares for his friends and tries to protect them in his own way. He is adept at protection magic, being able to become a long-lived sorcerer and most powerful physician if he continues developing and perfecting his magical talents in healing spells from the chapter of Protection from the legendary Grimoire of Zero. He ends up leaving with Saybil and Holt upon finally graduating and has accepted a job on gathering more information on Remnants of Disaster at the Forbidden Library.

Recurring

Zero was the main female protagonist/titular character of the prequel series, Grimoire of Zero.  She originally traveled with a half man/half beast called Mercenary in search of a book called the Grimoire of Zero that hides a mighty magical power that can destroy the world in its entirety. Over the next decade, she has grown into a tall and captivating woman with even greater magical ability than ever before, though not as powerful as Saybil's. She reveals herself to be the paternal aunt of Saybil. For quite some time, she has been suffering a severe case of magical reduction due to sacrificing a vast amount of her mana to revive her lover, Mercenary, from death in the previous series, leaving her quite vulnerable to her adversaries and from dying, which was the very reason why her elder brother, Thirteen, had sired Saybil for the boy's limitless powerful magic to be transferred to her. This is indeed done as a last resort for his famous aunt to become strong to defend everyone from the imminent massacre approaching the village. 

The white tiger beastfallen who was the main protagonist of the prequel series, Grimoire of Zero. In the next decade his face has grown rounder, and he has managed to fulfill his dream of owning a tavern for beastfallen, witches and humans alike. He continues to be fiercely loyal to the teenage Zero, now his wife, and will do whatever is necessary to ensure the severely magically depleted Mud-Black Witch's safety those she cherishes such as Saybil, for being her nephew.

 Formerly a killer and member of the Church who recently reformed who debuted in Episode 3 "Beyond the Steam". Due to photosensitivty, he dons a black material over his eyes which he removes only at night; revealing them to gray. He is quite calm and levelheaded regardless of his former status as a ruthless murderer. He is an expert at detecting lies from others by overseeing their micro-expressions. 

The Headmaster of the very first Royal Magic Academy and a very powerful witch in her own right, as the only descendant/grandchild of the renowned Mooncaller Witch Sorena. Her blonde hair is now waist-length but her feminine name is still unknown, despite her true gender as female has been known for one whole decade. 

A wolf Beastfallen and swordsman who sees his duty as serving Headmistress Albus since the vow he had made to her deceased grandmother Sorena of the Moon Caller Witch Clan. His face is quite different from the original anime, being more whitish and rounder. 

A white mouse beastfallen with a squeaky voice and a child-like appearance but is, in truth, more than two decades old. She is very timid and does not like crowds. She is quite incredible at cooking.

Supporting
Laios 
Laios is a young human boy who befriends the amnesic Saybil once he has lived in his home village for two months as a way to replenish the strong magic of those who have used it for too long. He knows the forest well, but ends up getting hurt badly by encountering a Remnant of Disaster, and is saved by the renowned Mud-Black Witch and Dawn Witch.
Uls
Uls is the father of Laois who helped with the test by staying home with his wife and young son. He then joined at the Mercenary's bar for a drink in celebration for Saybil Kudo and Holt for passing with flying colors as students in the field program.
Kady
Kady was a penniless boy whom the Anti-Witch Church had recruited as an assassin to eradicate "evil" witches. He was found by the immortal Dawn Witch, Professor Loux Krystas, with his face swollen by bees. He is then interrogated by Shinpu, who utilized his unique ability of lie detection, to ascertain whether more Remnants of Disaster had come with him. While enjoying himself with Mrs. Hearthful and her young students, which had included Laois, he became possessed by another rouge Remnant of Disaster and was ultimately killed from its malevolent influence and Holt's stronger Flagis spell. He was buried outside the village church.      

 
A redheaded bespectacled woman who teaches at the village school for human children, such as Laios, who debuted in Episode Nine. She was from the north and came to live in a village for both witches and humans, even though her home and family was attacked by a witch. The Tyrant himself seems to develop a crush on her, despite his strong feeling bloodlust.

Production
Kodansha Ranobe Bunko imprint sent their invitation to Kakeru Kobashiri for writing a sequel of Grimoire of Zero around November to December in 2017, and the publishment was confirmed in February 2018. It was announced in her blog in March 2018. She finished writing Volume 1 and revealed the synopsis of the sequel at that time. Although some main characters in Grimoire of Zero would be included, the protagonist would be someone else.

Media

Light novels
The light novel series is written by Kakeru Kobashiri and illustrated by Takashi Iwasaki, with partial character designs by Yoshinori Shizuma. Kodansha have published six volumes since August 2018 under their Kodansha Ranobe Bunko imprint. In March 2022, Kodansha USA announced they licensed the novels for English publication.

Manga
A manga adaptation with art by Tatsuwo began serialization in Kodansha's shōnen manga magazine Monthly Shōnen Sirius on July 26, 2019. It has been collected in six tankōbon volumes as of December 2022. The manga is licensed in North America by Kodansha USA.

Anime
In April 2021, an anime television series adaptation was announced. It is produced by Tezuka Productions and directed by Satoshi Kuwabara, who will also handle the series' scripts. Kakeru Kobashiri, the original writer, and Mayumi Morita are credited for literature, while character designs are provided by Reina Iwasaki. Tatsuhiko Saiki is composing the music. It aired from April 8 to July 1, 2022, on TBS and BS11. The opening theme song is "Dawn of Infinity" by fripSide, while the ending theme song is "Imprinting" by ▽▲TRiNITY▲▽. Crunchyroll licensed the series outside of Asia. Muse Communication licensed the series in South and Southeast Asia.

On April 11, 2022, Crunchyroll announced that the series will receive an English dub, which premiered on April 21.

Notes

References

External links
  
  
 

2018 Japanese novels
2022 anime television series debuts
Anime and manga based on light novels
Crunchyroll anime
Fantasy anime and manga
Kodansha books
Kodansha manga
Kodansha Ranobe Bunko
Light novels
Muse Communication
Shōnen manga
Tezuka Productions
TBS Television (Japan) original programming
Vertical (publisher) titles
Witchcraft in anime and manga
Witchcraft in written fiction